A Collective Bargain: Unions, Organizing, and the Fight for Democracy is a 2020 non-fiction book by union organizer Jane McAlevey. The book makes the case that unions are the only institution capable of confronting the corporate class.

A German edition was published by VSA: Verlag, a division of Springer Science+Business Media, on May 1, 2021, with the title "Macht.Gemeinsame Sache."

Overview
Chapters include "Workers Can Still Win Big, "Who Killed the Unions." "Everything You Thought You Knew About Unions was (Mostly) Wrong," "Are Unions Still Relevant?," "How Do Workers Get a Union?," "How To Rebuild A Union," "As Go Unions, So Goes The Republic."

Reception
The book received positive reviews.

References

External links
 Author's official website

American non-fiction books
2020 non-fiction books
Ecco Press books
Labor literature
Environmental non-fiction books
Trade unions